Play It to the Bone is a 1999 American sports comedy drama film, starring Antonio Banderas and Woody Harrelson, written and directed by Ron Shelton.

It follows the adventures of two boxers and best friends who travel to Las Vegas in order to fight each other for the sake of a chance to compete for the middleweight title. The film also starred Lolita Davidovich, Tom Sizemore, Lucy Liu, and Robert Wagner.

Cameo appearances include: Steve Lawrence, Tony Curtis, Wesley Snipes, Mike Tyson, Kevin Costner, Rod Stewart, Jennifer Tilly, Natasha Gregson Wagner, Drew Carey, Jacob Duran and Chuck Bodak. The film was released to negative critical and commercial reviews.

Plot
Aging prizefighters and longtime pals Cesar Dominguez and Vince Boudreau always regretted not getting one last shot. Out of the blue, such an opportunity comes their way — except it is to fight each other.

Boxing promoter Joe Domino has a problem on his hands. The fighters scheduled to be on his undercard in Las Vegas, a preliminary to a main event featuring heavyweight Mike Tyson, suddenly become unavailable at the last minute. He needs replacements fast, so a call is made to a gym in Los Angeles to see if Dominguez or Boudreau would be available. Both are. Domino hatches the idea to have them both fight.

The boxers negotiate one condition: the winner will be given a chance to fight for the middleweight championship. Domino agrees, although the untrustworthy promoter is not necessarily a man of his word.

Cesar and Vince have only a day to get to the fight. They decide to drive rather than fly, so they call upon friend Grace to drive them in her lime green Oldsmobile 442. She has been a love interest of both. Grace's own plan is to pitch her various money-making ideas to Vegas bigshots like hotel and casino boss Hank Goody and raise venture capital. Along the way, they pick up a hitchhiker whose insults finally result in Grace's flattening her with a solid right cross worthy of her traveling companions.

The fight between the two friends is sparsely attended, ringside fans and celebrities remaining uninterested until the night's main event. Cesar and Vince mix it up so savagely, however, beating each other to a bloody pulp, that fans in the arena begin paying more and more attention, as do commentators on television.

When the action-packed and dramatic bout comes to an end, Cesar and Vince are paid off, but promptly spend most of their money in the casino. Grace, too, comes away bruised and empty-handed, except for her everlasting relationship between a couple of hard-headed but soft-hearted guys.

Cast
 Woody Harrelson as Vince Boudreau
 Antonio Banderas as Cesar Dominguez
 Lolita Davidovich as Grace Pasic
 Tom Sizemore as Joe Domino
 Lucy Liu as Lia
 Robert Wagner as Hank Goody
 Richard Masur as Artie
 Willie Garson as "Cappie" Caplan
 Wesley Snipes had a cameo as Ringside Fan

Reception

Critical response
The film garnered a generally poor reception, with Rotten Tomatoes giving it a score of 11% based on 79 reviews and an average rating of 3.9 out of 10. The site's consensus states: "Flat characters and uninspired comedy yield forgettable results."
Professional critical reception was similar, with Empire magazine giving it just 2 stars out of 5.

References

External links

 
 

1999 films
1990s buddy films
1990s sports comedy-drama films
American buddy comedy-drama films
American sports comedy-drama films
American boxing films
Films directed by Ron Shelton
Films scored by Alex Wurman
Films about gambling
Touchstone Pictures films
1990s American films